Paragarista is a genus of moths of the family Noctuidae. Its only species, Paragarista albostriata, is known from New Guinea. Both the genus and the species were described by George Thomas Bethune-Baker in 1906.

References

Catocalinae